Vanina Paoletti (born 10 December 1997 in Nice) is a French canoeist.

In June 2021, she was named in the K4 500 alongside Sarah Guyot, Manon Hostens, Lea Jamelot for the delayed 2020 Summer Games in Tokyo. The bulk of that foursome had finished runners up in Szeged at the 2020 World Cup competition.

References

1997 births
Living people
French female canoeists
Canoeists at the 2020 Summer Olympics
Olympic canoeists of France